Fallon is an unincorporated community in Choctaw County, Oklahoma, United States, situated along U.S. Route 70.

References

Unincorporated communities in Choctaw County, Oklahoma
Unincorporated communities in Oklahoma